"Broken Vow" is a song that was written by Lara Fabian and Walter Afanasieff for Fabian's self-titled album released in 1999. The music track has a very strong resemblance to Piano Concerto No. 2 in C minor, Op.18: Adagio sostenuto by Sergei Rachmaninoff. It has since been recorded and performed by many other singers.

Other versions
"Broken Vow" was featured as an insert song in the Taiwanese drama Meteor Garden II. It has a music video consisting of several scenes from the drama.

Josh Groban first recorded the song in 2002 on his album, Closer.  It has also been recorded by Emile Pandolfi (2005), G4 (2005), Petra Berger and Jan Vayne (2008), and Thomas Spencer-Wortley (2009).  It is also a single by Philippines singer Sarah Geronimo in a duet with Mark Bautista and appeared in her debut album Popstar: A Dream Come True.  The song has also been performed by Kyla and Jay-R. Julie Anne San Jose (2012) also made a cover of the song as the theme song of the Philippine TV drama series of the same name.

Fabian rewrote the song with French lyrics for Jackie Evancho, who included it in her 2011 album, Dream With Me, under the name "Imaginer". The original meaning of the song, about a sad love, is completely changed in the French version to describe a dream of a peaceful world.

Harrison Craig, winner of The Voice series 2, sang "Broken Vow" as his audition, recorded the song with full orchestra and has produced a definitive rendering of Fabian's song.

Hamden, Connecticut-based Pop/New Age Artist, The 465 CT Transit driver performed an instrumental version during Newark Liberty International Airport's Arrivals Ceremony on September 30, 2013 to promote his upcoming instrumental debut album, The Bridge, was scheduled to be released in December 2013. His version are featured Máiréad Nesbitt (of Celtic Woman) on the violin.
 
Daniel Evans, a finalist in series 5 of The X Factor (UK) recorded an acoustic piano only version of this song for his iTunes debut album No Easy Way.

Track listings

Harrison Craig version 
Digital single – Universal (UMG)	
 "Broken Vow" (4:07)

Charts

Harrison Craig version

References

2003 singles
Lara Fabian songs
Sarah Geronimo songs
Josh Groban songs
Soul ballads
2000s ballads
Songs written by Walter Afanasieff
Song recordings produced by Walter Afanasieff